Shapcott Wensley was the pseudonym of the English author and poet Henry Shapcott Bunce (1854 – 1 June 1917).

Life 
He was born in  Bristol in the summer of 1854.  He died in Bristol on 1 June 1917.  He married a singer, Alice Mary Wensley, and they had one daughter, Gertrude.
By profession he was a clerk in a soap works. As a poet he adopted the combined names of his mother and his wife as his pseudonym, Shapcott Wensley. He wrote lyrics for songs and librettos for cantatas. Among the composers he worked for were Edward Elgar and John Henry Maunder. Many of his texts were written on commission of the publishing house Novello.

Works 
Summer on the River: a cantata for female voices, music by F. H. Cowen (1893)
A Sea Dream: a cantata for female voices, music by Walter Battison Haynes (1893)
The Banner of St. George: a ballad for chorus and orchestra, music by Edward Elgar (1896)
The Gate of Life: a dramatic cantata, music by Franco Leoni (1898)
The Story of Bethlehem: a short cantata, music by John E. West (1899)
The Lark and the Nightingale: part-song for SATB, music by Reginald Somerville (1900)
Olivet to Calvary: a sacred cantata, music by J. H. Maunder (1904)
Song of Thanksgiving: a sacred cantata, music by J. H. Maunder (1905)
Lo! Christ the Lord is born: a Christmas carol, music by Edward Elgar (1909)
The Call of England: song, music by Albert Ham (1917)
Our Soldiers, Welcome Home: song, music by Joseph L. Roeckel (1918)
The Song of the Gale: part-song for SATB, music by Myles B. Foster (1924)
While the Earth remaineth: cantata for SATB, organ, music by J. H. Maunder (?)

Notes

References 
 The Musical Times 58 (1917), p. 323 (obituaries).
 England censuses (1881 - 1901)

1855 births
1917 deaths
Writers from Bristol
English male poets
English songwriters